The Sap from Syracuse is a 1930 American pre-Code comedy film directed by A. Edward Sutherland and written by John Griffith Wray, along with Jack O'Donnell, John Hayden and Gertrude Purcell. The film stars Jack Oakie, Ginger Rogers, Granville Bates, George Barbier, and Verree Teasdale. The film was released on July 26, 1930, by Paramount Pictures.

Plot
When Littleton Looney, a crane driver, inherits $18,000 from his uncle, he decides to fulfill his dream and go to Europe (he is a great admirer of Napoleon). His ex-boss, Hopkins, and a couple of Hopkins' cronies decide to pull a prank on him; they send telegrams (supposedly from John D. Rockefeller, Henry Ford and others) to the captain of the luxury liner that Looney takes, asking that Looney be treated well. On the ship before it departs, one of the pranksters convince Senator Powell, another passenger, that Looney is Vanderhoff, a famous engineer, traveling incognito.

Also aboard is Ellen Saunders. She has 90 days to put some nickel mines in Macedonia into operation, despite not knowing anything about mining, otherwise she will lose them to a syndicate represented by her guardian, banker Sidney Hycross. She rejects his lowball offer for property worth "over a million." When she finds out that a noted engineer is aboard, she learns from the senator that it is Looney. Soon the senator has spread the news all over the ship. When Hycross hears it, he assigns Nick Pangalos the task of keeping Ellen away from Looney.

Hycross is pleased to receive a coded telegram informing him that the machinery Ellen needs has been stranded (at his orders) hundreds of miles from the mines. Ellen gets the same news and decides to consult Looney. Looney is only too happy to help however he can, and a romance develops between them. Meanwhile, he is pursued by a gold digger named Flo Goodrich, while her friend Dolly Clark targets Hycross.

Hycross, suspicious of Looney's alleged identity, goads Ellen into a bet: if Looney is not Vanderhoff, she will accept his deal and sign over the mines. Hycross sends a telegram to the Syracuse chamber of commerce. Hopkins, the organization's secretary, responds with a glowing recommendation, stating "he occupies a unique position in the engineering world". However, Hycross remains unconvinced. In Macedonia, he arranges for real engineers working on the mine problem to meet (and expose) Looney. The machinery cannot be transported to the mines until the September rains raise the level of a river. That would be too late. Looney finally confesses to Ellen that he is not an engineer. Upset, she tells Hycross she will sign his agreement. However, when a persistent engineer pleads with Looney, still believing he is the builder of the New Erie Canal, to think some more, Looney tells him, "Oh, dry up. Damn the canal." That suddenly gives him an idea. He tells the engineers to dam the river. The river bed is composed of slate, which will make a usable road for the stranded machinery. Impressed, "Senator Powell", who is really Vanderhoff, decides to hire Looney; the syndicate hired him to check up on Hycross. Looney ends up with Ellen and a job as consulting engineer at her mines.

Cast
Jack Oakie as Littleton Looney
Ginger Rogers as Ellen Saunders
Granville Bates as Sidney Hycross
George Barbier as Senator Powell
Sidney Riggs as Nick Pangolos
Betty Starbuck as Flo Goodrich
Verree Teasdale as Dolly Clark

References

External links
 
 

1930 films
1930 romantic comedy films
American black-and-white films
American romantic comedy films
Films directed by A. Edward Sutherland
Films set in Macedonia (region)
Films set in New York (state)
Films set on ships
Paramount Pictures films
1930s English-language films
1930s American films